Rajesh Kumar (born 20 January 1975) is an Indian actor and producer, best known for his roles in Indian television shows such as Baa Bahoo Aur Baby and Sarabhai vs Sarabhai. Rajesh is an alumnus of Hindu College, University of Delhi. He was last seen in the role of Gagan Rastogi in the second season of the Netflix series Kota Factory.

Personal life
Rajesh Kumar resides in Mumbai with his family. His ancestral home is in Gaya District, Bihar. He married Madhavi Chopra in 2004.

Filmography

Television

Films
 Men Will Be Men (2011) as Preet
 Super Nani (2014) as Suketu
Student of the Year 2 (2019) as Prem Narayan Sachdev

Web series

Awards

References

External links

Male actors from Patna
Living people
People from Bihar
1975 births
Indian male soap opera actors